Sungei Wang Plaza is a strata title shopping centre in Bukit Bintang, Kuala Lumpur, Malaysia. 

The mall has an aggregate retail floor area approximately 800,000 square feet (sq. ft.) and key anchor tenant includes Giant Supermarket, JUMPA @ Sungei Wang, Blastacars, Camp5, Daiso and MR. DIY. The shopping center is accessible from Bukit Bintang MRT/Monorail.

History

The shopping center was incorporated on 16 May 1972 and was opened for business in 1977. In 1992 and 2013, it underwent renovation and refurbishment. In 2018, it undergoes another facade transformation and is expected to be completed by mid 2019. 

The largest share of shopping mall owner is by Capitaland Malaysia Mall Trust (CMMT) which owns 62% of the share.

See also
 List of shopping malls in Malaysia

References

External links

 

1977 establishments in Malaysia
Shopping malls established in 1977
Shopping malls in Kuala Lumpur